Robert Liddell (1837 – December 2, 1893) was Mayor of Pittsburgh from 1878 to 1881.

Life
Robert Liddell was born in 1837 in England. He pursued the craft of beer making. During his administration, the Bureau of Water placed the Brilliant Pumping Facility into service.

In 1878, Holy Ghost Fathers started a college on the Bluff which would become Duquesne University. City streets were electrified in 1879 and Alexander Graham Bell's telephone went into limited use in Pittsburgh.

The city expanded west and south, annexing Mount Washington, Temperanceville and Birmingham.  When Mayor Liddell left office, he was employed as a liquor dealer.

Liddell died in 1893; and was buried at the Union Dale Cemetery.

See also

List of mayors of Pittsburgh

Sources
 Robert Liddell at Political Graveyard

1837 births
1893 deaths
Mayors of Pittsburgh
English emigrants to the United States
19th-century American politicians